Deep Hole or Deephole may refer to:

Places in the United States
Deephole, Kentucky, an unincorporated community in Lawrence County
Deep Hole, Nevada, a ghost town
Deep Hole, Virginia, an unincorporated community in Accomack County

Mathematics
Deep holes, certain points in a Leech lattice